Villa de Álvarez is a municipality in the Mexican state of Colima. 
The municipal seat lies at Villa de Álvarez. 

The municipality covers an area of 428.4 km², and, in 2005, reported a total population of 100,121.

References

Municipalities of Colima